In the United States, the Federal Communications Commission Computer Inquiries were a trio of interrelated FCC Inquiries focused on problems posed by the convergence of regulated telephony with unregulated computing services. These Computer Inquiries created rules and requirements designed to prevent cross subsidization, discrimination, and anti-competitive behavior from companies such as Bell Operating Companies (BOCs) to enter the enhanced services market.

Background
In the 1960s, The Federal Communications Commission ("FCC" or "Commission") awoke to the reality of powerful computers running communications networks, and communications networks over which humans interacted with really powerful computers.  In 1966, the FCC was interested in the difference between computers that facilitate communications and computers with which people communicate.  The Commission had to make a decision on whether both of these types of computers should be regulated as a basic phone service.  "The task before the Commission was the nature and extent of the regulatory jurisdiction to be applied to data processing services; and whether, under what circumstances, and subject to what conditions or safeguards, common carriers should be permitted to engage in data processing." To answer these questions, the Commission launched the first Computer Inquiry.

Computer I
In the 1960s the FCC faced a problem with existing regulated communication networks, such as AT&T who offered basic communication service.  Companies such as AT&T had found a way to add computers to the ends of these existing networks by layering protocols on top of the network to achieve data processing. These enhancements if left unregulated threatened growth of these services. In 1970, the FCC made its first attempt at dividing the computer world into two categories: computers that ran communication networks and computers at the end of telephone lines that people interacted. "The division was technological, focused on computer processing, attempting to divide the difference between circuit or message switching and data processing." This division by the Commission were either called "pure communications" or "pure data processing."

Pure Communications/Pure Data Processing/Hybrid cases 
If a message is sent from one location to another and it does not change, the FCC defined it as Pure Communication. On the other hand, if a changes or processing happen at the end of phone line the FCC defined it as Pure Data Processing. In pure data processing the computer processes the information and determines if it is a circuit or message-switching. Also, in pure data processing the computer processes the information by using storing, retrieving, sorting, merging or calculating data functions based on how the computer is programmed. Some computer processing, however, use both pure communication and pure data processing. The FCC was not too sure how to handle these situations and created a third category known as hybrids. Hybrid cases were considered a gray area and the FCC planned to resolve these gray services on case-by-case basis. The FCC determined if there is more communications, then it was communications; if it was more data processing, then it was data processing. Hybrid cases became Computer Inquires I's undoing as it did not clearly define pure and data communications.

Regulations 
Pure communications and pure data processing have very different characteristics that led to different policy results. The markets that the technology existed on assisted the FCC make its policy decisions. "The pure data processing market was viewed as an innovative, competitive market with low barriers to entry and little chance of monopolization." The FCC established  that no additional regulation or safeguards where required for the pure data processing market. The pure communications market on the other hand was being managed by an incumbent monopoly. The FCC had four concerns about the incumbent telephone companies which were: "the sale of data processing services by carriers should not hurt the provision of common carrier services, the costs of such data processing services should not be passed on to telephone rate payers, revenues derived from common carrier services should not be used to cross subsidize data processing services, and the furnishing of such data processing services by carriers should not hurt the competitive computer market."

Safeguard: Maximum Separation 
With concerns relating to communication facility, the FCC developed its "Maximum Separation" safeguards. The FCC made it so that if carrier wanted to enter the unregulated data processing market they could only do so by going through a fully separate subsidiary. The separate subsidiary needed to have a separate data processing corporation, accounting books, offices, personnel, equipment, and facilities. The carrier also could not use the separate subsidiary to promote their data processing services, use network computers for non-network purposes, or use network computers during peak hours to provision data processing services.

Computer II

In 1976, the FCC was astounded by the number of hybrid cases that used both "pure communication" and "pure data processing" thus leading to the launch of the Second Computer Inquiry. After Computer I took effect, new technological developments in the telecommunications and computer industries exposed flaws in its definitional structure approach to evaluating the "hybrid category". Dumb terminals had become smart, the cost of computer processing units (CPU's) dropped, logical networks overlaying physical networks, and microcomputers made their appearance that set the stage for the scrapping of Computer Inquiry I. The Commission's situation was "more complicated" and eventually led to the birth of the basic versus enhanced services dichotomy.  This established a division between “common carrier transmission services from those computer services which depend on common carrier services in the transmission of information.”

Basic versus Enhanced Dichotomy
If a carrier offers a pure transmission over a path that is transparent in terms of its interaction with customer supplied information, the FCC considered this to fall into the basic service category. Basic service includes processing the movement of information and computer processing, which includes protocol conversion, security, and memory storage. The category of basic service is everything from "voice telephone calls" to a phone company's lease of private lines.

If a carrier offers services over common carrier transmission facilities that employ computer processing applications that act on the format, content, code, protocol or similar aspects of the subscriber's transmitted information; provide the subscriber additional, different, or restructured information; or involve subscriber interaction with stored information, the FCC consider this to fall into the enhanced services category. The Commission found that e-mail, voice mail, the World Wide Web, newsgroups, fax store-and-forward, interactive voice response, gateway, audiotext information services, and protocol processing are enhanced services.

The FCC did not want to fall into the same trap as they did with Computer Inquiry I and having a hybrid category. They wanted to make sure that every application fell into either the basic or enhanced service. "The Commission made the classification dependent upon the nature of the activity involved." The nature of the activity involved would determine if it fell into the communications or data processing service. This changed the process from an examination of the technology to an examination of the service provisioned.

To eliminate the hybrid cases in the basic versus enhanced dichotomy the FCC designed a "bright-line test" The FCC bright-line test defined enhanced services as anything more than the transmission capacity of basic service." A three prong test was also established to test enhanced services. The three prong test "employs computer processing applications that: act on the format, content, code, protocol or similar aspects of a subscriber's transmitted information; provide the subscriber additional, different, or restructured information; or involve subscriber interaction with stored information." "The enhanced service is layered on top, creating a new service for the edge user."  "The image the Commission has at this time is of enhanced service providers (“ESPs”) acquiring basic services, adding enhanced services, and then selling the bundled service to consumers on a resale basis."

Adjunct Services
If a regulated service uses a traditional telephone service and it does not change the fundamental character of the telephone service, the FCC considered it as an Adjunct service. An example of this would be directory assistance. Directory assistance provides a phone number that uses a telephone network. Directory service is characterized as a basic service, which does not transform into an enhanced service.

Computer III
In 1985, the FCC launched the last phase of regulations, Computer Inquiries III prior to the deployment of the Internet to the consumer. Computer Inquiries II established the basic and enhanced service dichotomy, but Computer Inquiries III kept the policy objectives the same while changing how these services were implemented. The Computer Inquiries III wanted to make sure that the separate subsidiary requirements of Computer Inquiry II did not have additional costs to the public with decreased service and innovation by Bell Operating Companies (BOCS) from using existing regulated operations to benefit from the unregulated enhanced services.
The FCC found that the cost of structural separation was more important than not having nonstructural safeguards in place for the Enhanced Service Providers (ESPs) by the BOCs. "
These separate structural subsidiaries were not required to be set up by the BOCs if they were moving from a structural safeguard to non-structural safeguard. To set up these safeguards the FCC created two non-structural safeguards called the Comparatively Efficient Interconnection ("CEI") and Open Network Architecture ("ONA").

Comparatively Efficient Interconnection
The BOCs to solve the non-structural separation for entering into enhanced services created a temporary solution called the Comparatively Efficient Interconnection (CEI). The CEI allowed BOCs to enter the enhanced service market on a non-structural basis. This allowed the ESP to integrate with the BOC and the separate subsidiary was no longer needed. Under current rules, the FCC permitted the company to post their CEI plans on the company website.  The following information must be included in the CEI plan: information on interface functionality, unbundling of basic services, resale, technical characteristics, installation, maintenance and repair, end-user access, CEI availability, minimization of transport costs, and recipients of CEI." The CEI plans were used to make sure that if a BOC had terms and conditions with an affiliated ESP’s they would provide the same provisions to non-affiliated ESP’s. This was intended to provide ESPs equal access to basic services that the BOCs use to provide their own enhanced service.

Open Network Architecture
The second safeguard that the FCC introduced required BOCs to break their networks into “basic building blocks” and make those available to ESPs to build new services, which became known as the Open network architecture (ONA) The basic service offering by the BOCs were to be broken apart to help the ESP market. The building blocks would be divided by the BOCs as follows: Basic Service Elements, Basic Serving Arrangements, Complimentary Network Services, and Ancillary Network Services. Even if a BOC did not want to enter the ESP market they were required to file with the FCC their ONA plans. If the BOCs successfully filed an ONA plan with the Commission, it would then be permitted to provide integrated ESP services without filing a CEI plan.

Safeguards
The Computer Inquiries III provided safeguards that fell upon different entities into the following categories: annual ONA reporting, network information disclosure, cross-subsidization prohibitions, accounting safeguards, and customer proprietary network information.

Annual ONA Reporting
In 1989, the FCC created a reporting structure that the BOCs are required to file quarterly, semi-annual, and annual reports for their ONA that include the following information: "annual projected deployment schedules for ONA service, by type of service (BSA, BSE, CNS), in terms of percentage of access lines served system-wide and by market area; disposition of new ONA service requests from ISPs; disposition of ONA service requests that have previously been designated for further evaluation; disposition of ONA service requests that were previously deemed technically infeasible; information on Signaling System 7 (SS7), Integrated Services Digital Network (ISDN), and Intelligent Network (IN) projected development in terms of percentage of access lines served system-wide and on a market area basis; new ONA services available through SS7, ISDN, and IN; progress in the IILC (now NIIF) on continuing activities implementing service-specific and long-term uniformity issues; progress in providing billing information including Billing Name and Address (BNA), line-side Calling Number Identification (CNI), or possible CNI alternatives, and call detail services to ISPs; progress in developing and implementing Operation Support Systems (OSS) services and ESP access to those services; progress on the uniform provision of OSS services; and  a list of BSEs used in the provision of BOC/GTE's own enhanced services." "In addition, the BOCs are required to report annually on the unbundling of new technologies arising from their own initiative, in response to requests by ISPs, or resulting from requirements imposed by the Commission." As of February 2011, the FCC to better serve the public interest have temporarily waived the reporting of these ONA reports to eliminate added expenses to the BOCs in preparing these reports.

Network Information Disclosure
Carriers are required by the FCC to disclosure to the public all information relating to network design and technical standards and information affecting changes to the telecommunications network which would affect either inter-carrier interconnection or the manner in which customer-premises equipment is attached to the interstate network prior to implementation and with reasonable advance notification. This information is called Network Information Disclosure and is set in 47 CFR 51.325 through 51.335. These procedures require public notice by the carrier if changes are made to the network that would cause it to be unavailable with another service provider or affect a provider's performance. If network changes are made the carrier must provide references to technical specifications, protocols, and standards regarding the transmission, signal, routing, and facility assignment as well any new technology or equipment that may affect the connection to the consumer.

Cross-Subsidization Prohibitions
A carrier may not use services not subject to competition to subsidize a service that is subject to competition, if they do the FCC consider it as cross-subsidization prohibitions. An example of this would be a carrier could not fund their Internet services from a noncompetitive local telephone revenue.

Accounting Safeguards
The FCC created a series of accounting safeguards that can be found in Subpart I of Part 64 of Title 47, Code of Federal Regulations.  Annual independent audits are performed to ensure certain carriers are not improperly cross subsidizing their services.  The final reports of these independent audits are publicly available and can be obtained by contacting the Accounting Safeguards Division of the FCC’s Common Carrier Bureau.  The FCC provides information about Common Carrier account on their ARMIS database on their website.

Customer Proprietary Network Information
The FCC needed to create restrictions on BOCs to gather sensitive information from their subscribers. This safeguard to protect subscriber's information has become known as the Customer Proprietary Network Information (CPNI).  The FCC require carriers to provide any customer proprietary network information available to the public on the same terms and conditions of the affiliated ESP if requested.

In 1996, Congress passed the new Privacy of Customer Information provision, codified as Section 222 of the Communications Act. Under this section 222 Customer Proprietary Network Information (CPNI) is defined as "information that relates to the quantity, technical configuration, type, destination, location, and amount of use of a telecommunications service subscribed to by any customer of a telecommunications carrier, and that is made available to the carrier by the customer solely by virtue of the carrier-customer relationship; and information contained in the bills pertaining to telephone exchange service or telephone toll service received by a customer of a carrier, except that such term does not include subscriber list information.

See also
Net Neutrality

References

Federal Communications Commission